Terence Murray may refer to:

 Terence Aubrey Murray (1810–1873), Australian pastoralist and parliamentarian
 Terence Murray (referee), Irish hurling referee